Bury Elminster Deep is a fantasy novel by Ed Greenwood, set in the world of the Forgotten Realms, and based on the Dungeons & Dragons role-playing game. It is one of the novels in "The Elminster Series". It was published in hardcover in August 2011 and in paperback in June 2012.

Plot summary
Elminster has been rendered bodiless and unable to perform magic by the Spellplague and the death of his goddess Mystra.  He tries to find a way to stop Lord Manshoon from taking over the kingdom of Cormyr.

Reception
John Ottinger III from Black Gate comments that "Greenwood has played a little too long and a little too roughly with his best character. Elminster is losing form and therefore losing interest for the reader. Bury Elminster Deep is monotonous and boring."

Bury Elminster Deep received a positive review from California Bookwatch, which called it "a top pick for any fantasy collection".

References

2011 American novels
2011 fantasy novels
Forgotten Realms novels
Novels by Ed Greenwood
Wizards of the Coast books